Orthosoma is a genus of beetles in the family Cerambycidae. It is monotypic, being represented by the single species Orthosoma brunneum. The genus name Orthosoma was also previously used for a microsporidian genus. As the name is pre-occupied by this beetle genus, the name for the microsporidian has been changed to Orthosomella.

References

Further reading
 Arnett, R.H. Jr., M. C. Thomas, P. E. Skelley and J. H. Frank. (eds.). (2002). American Beetles, Volume II: Polyphaga: Scarabaeoidea through Curculionoidea. CRC Press LLC, Boca Raton, FL.
 Arnett, Ross H. (2000). American Insects: A Handbook of the Insects of America North of Mexico. CRC Press.
 Monné, Miguel A., and Edmund F. Giesbert (1995). Checklist of the Cerambycidae and Disteniidae (Coleoptera) of the Western Hemisphere, 2nd ed., xiv + 420.
 Richard E. White. (1983). Peterson Field Guides: Beetles. Houghton Mifflin Company.

Prioninae
Monotypic beetle genera